Machine Gun Etiquette is the third studio album by English punk rock band the Damned, released on 2 November 1979 by Chiswick Records.

Background 
The album was the group's first since reforming with a new lineup of previous members Dave Vanian on vocals, Captain Sensible on lead guitar, Rat Scabies on drums, plus newcomer Algy Ward of heavy metal band Tank on bass guitar on his only album with the band. On Machine Gun Etiquette, the band brought more variety to their usual punk rock to add wide-ranging influences from hard rock and heavy metal to psychedelic rock, a tinge of progressive rock and even classic rhythm and blues. The album also features more fast-paced punk tracks, and has been cited as a 'proto-hardcore' record crucial for the later rise of hardcore punk into the 1980s.

The voice at the album's start is actor Jack Howarth, taken from his 1971 album Ow Do, a recording of Lancastrian monologues. The mispronounced album name would later be used in fusion with Thee Headcoats name as the Japanese band name Thee Michelle Gun Elephant by their former bassist.

Critical reception

AllMusic's retrospective review reported that when it was released, Machine Gun Etiquette was "deservedly hailed as another classic from the band". The website praised the variety of styles explored and the group's typically strong wit. Scott Rowley of Classic Rock'' magazine, reviewing the 25th Anniversary Edition of the album, defined it as "a riotous, ballsy rush of an album [...] the sound of a band coming into its own", adding that "while the Clash looked to America for inspiration, the Damned remained resolutely British", perhaps ironically given that the front cover depicted the band in a New York street scene at 704 7th Avenue, New York City.

Track listing

2004 CD reissue bonus tracks
"Smash It Up (Part 1)" and "Smash It Up (Part 2)" are listed as one track on the CD, as "Smash It Up (Parts 1 and 2)" (track 11).

Personnel
Credits adapted from the 2004 CD reissue liner notes.The Damned Dave Vanian – lead vocals
 Captain Sensible – guitars, backing vocals, keyboards, bass ("I Just Can't Be Happy Today", "Smash It Up (Parts 1 & 2)"), bass solo ("Anti-Pope"), mandolin ("Turkey Song"), lead vocals ("Turkey Song")
 Rat Scabies – drums, backing vocals, lead vocals ("Burglar")
 Algy Ward – bass, backing vocals, guitar ("Machine Gun Etiquette", "Liar")Additional personnel Joe Strummer – backing vocals ("Noise, Noise, Noise"), hand claps ("Machine Gun Etiquette") 
 Topper Headon – backing vocals ("Noise, Noise, Noise")
 Henry Badowski – backing vocals ("Noise, Noise, Noise")
 Paul Simonon – hand claps ("Machine Gun Etiquette")
 Lemmy Kilmister – bass, backing vocals ("Ballroom Blitz")
 Anthony More – synthesizer ("Rabid (Over You)")Production and artwork'''
 Roger Armstrong – producer
 The Damned – producer
 Ed Hollis – producer ("Love Song" (Ed Hollis version), "Noise, Noise, Noise" (Ed Hollis version), "Suicide")
 Alvin Clarke – engineer (Sound Suite)
 Mike Shipley – engineer (Wessex)
 Gary Edwards – engineer (Wessex)
 Jeremy Green – engineer (Wessex)
 Rik Watton – engineer (Workhouse)
 Damian Korner – engineer (Utopia)
 G. H. Wallis – engineer (SGS)
 Vic Keary – engineer (Chalk Farm)
 Phil Smee – artwork
 Alan Ballard – front cover photography
 Mick Young – photography
 Captain Sensible – inner sleeve drawing
 Martin Baker – video director ("Plan 9, Channel 7")

References

External links 
 

1979 albums
The Damned (band) albums
Chiswick Records albums